SVIIB is the fourth and final studio album by American indie rock band School of Seven Bells, consisting of Alejandra Deheza (vocals) and Benjamin Curtis (instruments and production). After the 2013 death of Curtis from T-cell lymphoblastic lymphoma, Deheza completed the album using previously recorded material, with assistance from producer Justin Meldal-Johnsen. Most of the material had been recorded from before Curtis's illness, but one track, "Confusion," was recorded while Curtis was in the hospital, with help from Curtis's brother Brandon. The album was released digitally on February 12, 2016, with US and UK releases February 26, 2016 by Vagrant Records and Full Time Hobby, respectively. Deheza described the album as "a love letter from start to finish"; although Deheza and Curtis had ended their relationship in 2010, the two remained close friends and collaborators until Curtis's death.

The album was generally well received, with Pitchfork describing it as "the group's most technically accomplished work, their perfected swan song." Entertainment Weekly ranked it at #19 on their top 50 albums of 2016, calling it the group's "marvelous capstone," and AllMusic named it one of the best indie albums of 2016, calling it "radiantly illustrated with expressions of bliss, frustration, consolation, reassurance, and, ultimately, grief."

Track listing

Personnel 
 Alejandra Deheza – vocals
 Benjamin Curtis – engineering, production
 Justin Meldal-Johnsen - production, additional guitar, bass, drums, keyboards, percussion
 Brandon Curtis, Chris Bellman, Mike Schuppan - engineering
 Carlos de la Garza, Gabe Wax, Nicholas Vernhes, Steve Choo - additional engineering
 Guy Licata - additional guitar and drums
 Bryan Abdul Collins - art direction, design
 Dave Cooley - mastering
 Tony Hoffer - mixing
 Cameron Lister - mixing assistant

Charts

References 

2016 albums
School of Seven Bells albums
Vagrant Records albums
Full Time Hobby albums